The components of the pixels (primary colors red, green and blue) in an image sensor or display can be ordered in different patterns, called pixel geometry.

The geometric arrangement of the primary colors within a pixel varies depending on usage (see figure 1). In monitors, such as LCDs or CRTs, that typically display edges or rectangles, the components are  arranged in vertical stripes. Displays with motion pictures should instead have triangular or diagonal patterns so that the image variation is perceived better by the viewer.

Knowledge of the pixel geometry used by a display may be used to create raster images of higher apparent resolution using subpixel rendering.

See also
PenTile matrix family
Quattron
Bayer filter
 Subpixel rendering

References

Digital imaging